Antoine Béghin (born 31 May 1974) is a French rower. He competed in the men's coxless four event at the 2000 Summer Olympics.

References

External links
 

1974 births
Living people
French male rowers
Olympic rowers of France
Rowers at the 2000 Summer Olympics
People from Dinan
World Rowing Championships medalists for France
Sportspeople from Côtes-d'Armor